The Practice is an American sitcom starring Danny Thomas that centers on a father and son who are both doctors in New York City. The show aired from January 30, 1976, to January 26, 1977.

Cast
Danny Thomas as Dr. Jules Bedford
Dena Dietrich as Molly Gibbons
Shelley Fabares as Jenny Bedford
David Spielberg as Dr. David Bedford
Didi Conn as Helen
Allen Price as Paul Bedford
Damon Raskin as Tony Bedford
John Byner as Dr. Roland Caine (Season 1)
Mike Evans as Lenny  (Season 2)
Sam Laws as Nate

Synopsis

Jules Bedford is a crusty, sometimes grumpy, and somewhat absent-minded old-school doctor with a genuine concern for people; he is idealistic about the practice of medicine, caring for people even when there is no money to be made. His office is in a middle-class area on Manhattans West Side, where Molly Gibbons is the nurse who has been with him for years and has a crush on him. Helen is his young and slightly crazy receptionist and office manager.

Juless son David is also a doctor, but is less idealistic: His practice is on exclusive Park Avenue and he is more interested in making money than his father. David is always trying to get Jules to move his practice in with Davids and share office space. Jenny is Davids wife, and they are the parents of two young boys, Paul and Tony.

Dr. Roland Caine is Jules associate during the first season in the spring of 1976; a medical intern named Lenny is with him during the second season in the autumn of 1976.

Production

Steve Gordon created The Practice and Danny Thomas was its executive producer. Gordon wrote some of the episodes, and other episode writers included Jack Ainob, John Boni, Sam Denoff, Bernie Kahn, Bruce Kane,  Dale McRaven, Rick Mittleman, Jim Rogers, Bruce Selitz, Arnold Somkin, Norman Stiles, and Mark Tuttle.

Episode directors included Richard Kinon, Tony Mordente, Bill Persky, and Noam Pitlik.

During the first season, classical music played during The Practices opening credits. While the visuals for the opening credits remained unchanged for the second season, the music changed to a new ragtime theme.

Broadcast history

During its first season, The Practice aired on NBC on Fridays at 8:30 p.m., from January 30 to May 14, 1976. It returned for a second season, airing from October 13 through November 1976 on Wednesdays at 8:00 p.m. and shifting to Wednesdays at 9:30 p.m. from December 1976 through the end of its run. Its last original episode aired on January 26, 1977. Four additional episodes were never broadcast.

Episodes
Sources

Series overview

Season 1 (1976)

Season 2 (1976–77)

References

External links
 
 Season Two opening credits for The Practice on YouTube

NBC original programming
1976 American television series debuts
1977 American television series endings
1970s American sitcoms
English-language television shows
Television shows set in New York City
Television series by MGM Television
Television series by Warner Bros. Television Studios